Wang Fei (born 12 July 1988) is a Chinese rower. She competed in the women's coxless four event at the 2020 Summer Olympics.

References

External links
 

1988 births
Living people
Chinese female rowers
Olympic rowers of China
Rowers at the 2020 Summer Olympics
Place of birth missing (living people)
Asian Games gold medalists for China
Rowers at the 2018 Asian Games
Asian Games medalists in rowing
Medalists at the 2018 Asian Games
21st-century Chinese women